The following squads took part in the 1964 Men's Olympic Volleyball Tournament. It was the first edition of the event, organised by the world's governing body, the FIVB in conjunction with the IOC. It was held in Yokohama and Tokyo, Japan from 13 to 23 October 1964.

João Cláudio França
 José da Costa
 Hamilton de Oliveira
 Emanuel Newdon
 Carlos Feitosa
 Marco Antônio Volpi
 Carlos Arthur Nuzman
 José Ramalho
 Décio Viotti de Azevedo
 Victor Barcellos Borges
 Giuseppe Mezzasalma 
 Pedro Barbosa de Oliveira
Head coach
Samy Mehlinski

Dimitar Karov
 Ivan Kochev
 Georgi Konstantinov
 Petko Pantaleev
 Petar Krachmarov
 Simeon Srandev
 Lachezar Stoyanov
 Boris Gyuderov
 Kiril Ivanov
 Slavcho Slavov
 Georgi Boyadzhiev
 Angel Koritarov
Head coach
Dimitar Zahariev

Milan Čuda
 Bohumil Golián
 Zdeněk Humhal
 Petr Kop
 Josef Labuda
 Josef Musil
 Karel Paulus
 Boris Perušič
 Pavel Schenk
 Vac Smidl
 Josef Šorm
 Ladislav Toman
Head coach

Béla Czafik 
 Vilmos Iváncsó 
 Csaba Lantos 
 Gábor Bodó 
 István Molnár 
 Ottó Prouza 
 Ferenc Tüske 
 Tibor Flórián 
 László Gálos 
 Antal Kangyerka 
 Mihály Tatár 
 Ferenc Jánosi 
Head coach

Yutaka Demachi 
 Tsutomu Koyama 
 Sadatoshi Sugahara 
 Naohiro Ikeda 
 Yassu Saito 
 Toshiaki Kosedo 
 Toki Higuchi 
 Massa Minami 
 Takeshi Tokutomi 
 Teru Moriyama 
 Yūzo Nakamura 
 Katsutoshi Nekoda
Head coach
Yasutaka Matsudaira

Frank Constandse 
 Jacques Ewalds 
 Rob Groenhuyzen 
 Jan van der Hoek 
 Jurjaan Koolen 
 Jaap Korsloot 
 Jan Oosterbaan 
 Dinco van der Stoep 
 Piet Swieter 
 Joop Tinkhof 
 Jacques de Vink 
 Hans van Wijnen 
Head coach

Gheorghe Fieraru 
Horaţiu Nicolau 
Aurel Drăgan 
Iuliu Szöcs 
William Schreiber 
Mihai Grigorovici 
Davila Plocon 
Nicolae Bărbuţă 
Eduard Derzsei 
Mihai Chezan 
Constantin Ganciu 
Mihai Coste
Head coach

Kim In-su 
 O Pyeong-gil 
 Son Yeong-wan 
 Jeong Seon-hong 
 Park Seo-gwang 
 Seo Ban-seok 
 Lee Gyu-so 
 Kim Yeong-jun 
 Kim Seong-gil 
 Kim Gwang-su 
 Kim Jin-hui 
 Im Tae-ho
Head coach

Ivan Bugaenkov 
 Nikolai Burobin 
 Yuri Chesnokov 
 Vascha Kacharava 
 Valery Kalatschikhin 
 Vitaly Kovalenko 
 Stanislav Ljugailo 
 Georgy Mondzolevsky 
 Yuri Poryarkov 
 Eduard Sibiryakov 
 Yuri Vengorovsky 
 Dimitri Voskoboynikov
Head coach

Mike Bright
 Barry Brown
 Keith Erickson
 William Griebenow
 Richard Hammer
 Jacob Highland
 Ron Lang
 Charles Nelson
 Michael O'Hara
 Ernie Suwara
 John Taylor
 Pedro Velasco
Head coach
Harry Wilson

References

External links
Team rosters at Todor66.com

1964